Scroll painting usually refers to a painting on a scroll in Asian traditions, distinguishing between:

Handscroll, such a painting in horizontal format
Hanging scroll, such a painting in vertical format